Olga Vyacheslavovna Yurkina (born 21 September 1979) is a Belarusian former artistic gymnast. She competed at the 1996 Summer Olympics,  as well as multiple World and European Championships in the 1990’s. 

Olga currently coaches at Roswell Gymnastics in Roswell, Georgia along with her sister Yulia.

References

1979 births
Living people
Belarusian female artistic gymnasts
Gymnasts at the 1996 Summer Olympics
Olympic gymnasts of Belarus
Place of birth missing (living people)